Tursunay Ziyawudun (born 10 August 1978), born in Kunes of Xinjiang, is a former Uyghur detainee in one of the re-education camps in Xinjiang, China.

Testimony
Ziyawudun claims that she was taken to one of the internment camps in April of 2017 and was released after a few months, but she was detained in March of 2018 for the second time. She was released from the camp in December 2018 and was allowed to go to Kazakhstan to unite with her husband in September of 2019. She then gave interviews to the press describing the emotional trauma of the re-education center, even while fearing Chinese retaliation. She also told the Associated Press that she was physically abused during interrogation, kicked in the stomach repeatedly and forcibly sterilized. She is now unable to have children.

See also
Uyghur Americans
Xinjiang re-education camps
Uyghur Human Rights Policy Act
Magnitsky Act
United States sanctions against China

References

External links
 Uygur woman describes torture in China’s Xinjiang ‘vocational training’ camps

Living people
Uyghurs
1989 births
Chinese expatriates in the United States
Persecution of Uyghurs
Genocide survivors